Dr. Abdinur Sheikh Mohamed is a Somali educator and politician. He holds a Ph.D. in educational administration from the Ohio State University. Mohamed worked for a number of years with the Ohio Department of Education. From 2010 to 2011, he served as Minister of Education, Higher Education and Culture of Somalia under Prime Minister Mohamed Abdullahi Mohamed (Farmajo) in the Transitional Federal Government. Mohamed currently is an educational consultant and Title III state coordinator with the Lau Resource Center for English as a Second Language, Bilingual and Multicultural Education at the Ohio Department of Education. He is also an adjunct professor at Otterbein University in Westerville.

References

Living people
Ethnic Somali people
Somalian emigrants to the United States
Somalian politicians
Ohio State University College of Education and Human Ecology alumni
Year of birth missing (living people)
Otterbein University faculty